All This Love may refer to:

 All This Love (album), an album by DeBarge
 "All This Love" (DeBarge song), the title song
All This Love (Robin Schulz song)
 "All This Love", a song by The Similou from So Hot Right Now